Kristoffer Joner (born 19 September 1972) is a Norwegian actor. He is best known for his roles in Villmark and The Man Who Loved Yngve. He was a part of Rogaland Teater when he was 14 years of age until his early 20s. He was one of the founders of Cementen pub located in Stavanger, Norway.
In 1996, he got the role as Ståle Pettersen in an original NRK series called Offshore, a role he kept until the shows cancellation in 2000. In the same year, he got his first movie role in a Pål Jackman movie by the name of Detektor, where he played the role of a satanist.

In 2005, Joner received Amanda Award for best male actor, for his role in the movie Naboer, and again in 2012 for his role in The Orheim Company.

Additionally, he is the nephew of musician Sverre Joner, and cousin of singer Alexandra Joner.

Career 
Joner's films  include Detector, Mongoland, Villmark, Loose Ends, Samaritan, Min Misunnelige Frisør, Kissed by Winter, Naboer, Gymnaslærer Pedersen, The Man Who Loved Yngve, Hidden (Skjult) and War Sailor.

He was named one of the "Shooting Stars" by European Film Promotion in 2003.

Awards

Amanda Award 
2005 Best Male Actor – Naboer

2012 Best Male Actor – The Orheim Company

2017 Best Male Actor - Hjertestart

Filmography 
This filmography is not full but rather a representative one.

References

External links

1972 births
Living people
Actors from Stavanger
Norwegian male film actors
Norwegian male television actors
21st-century Norwegian male actors
20th-century Norwegian male actors